Georgie Lamon (11 November 1934 – 16 January 2016) was a Swiss politician killed in the 2016 Ouagadougou attacks in Burkina Faso.

Political Career
Lamon's political career began as being chair for the Social Democratic Party (PS). Following, he served in the Grand Council of Valais, with the PS. Lamon served as a National Councillor for Valais as a member of the PS.

Charity work and death
Lamon founded the charity Yelen with the objective of building canteens for schools. While in Ouagadougou on a trip to dedicate a canteen built by Yelen, Lamon was killed at a restaurant during the 2016 Ouagadougou attacks along his with former colleague Jean-Noël Rey.

References

Swiss politicians
Victims of Islamic terrorism
2016 deaths
1934 births
Swiss people murdered abroad
People murdered in Burkina Faso